Purvanchal is a subregion of the Bhojpuri region of India which comprises eastern Uttar Pradesh. Purvanchal region gained independence from the Avadh and Mughal rule under Zamindar Balwant Singh, a Bhumihar zamindar from Benaras State.

In recent years there has been a demand for a separate state, bifurcation from the state Uttar Pradesh. Purvanchal region in spite of being politically active fares poorly in HDI index and remains most underdeveloped region of India, with lack of industries and employment opportunities people flocking to metro cities of Delhi, Mumbai.

Demand for separate state
People from the state have demanded separate statehood for Purvanchal, with Varanasi, Prayagraj or Gorakhpur as its capital. And Bhojpuri should be given the status of official language of Purvanchal state
 1 June 2008: A separate state can ensure the security of borders as well as overall development in which the region is lagging far behind in comparison to western and central Uttar Pradesh, said Yogi Adityanath (then a BJP Member of Parliament from Gorakhpur; he became Chief Minister of Uttar Pradesh in 2017).
 8 July 2017: Union Minister Ramdas Athawale states his support for the division of the state for development of the region of the Bhojpuri-speaking population.
 4 August 2018: Uttar Pradesh Minister Om Prakash Rajbhar demands separate statehood for Purvanchal, pushes for liquor ban.
 19 September 2018: the Purvanchal State Movement got national exposure when Vandana Raghuwanshi, an activist of "Purvanchal Rajya Janandolan", set a state-run Volvo bus on fire as it was about to depart for Lucknow from Roadways Bus Station of Varanasi, in response to the central government's indifference to Anuj Rahi Hindustani's hunger strike, which was on its 35th day.

Culture
It is a predominantly Bhojpuri-speaking region.

Home to a few oldest living cities in the world, Purvanchal has always been appealing to people from everywhere for numerous reasons. With cities like Varanasi, Ayodhya, Sarnath, Kushinagar and Gorakhpur, Purvanchal will continue to mystify people for generations to come.

Purvanchal is one of the most ancient regions of India, with a rich heritage and culture. Today it is among the most significant parts of Uttar Pradesh, for many reasons, be it politically, economically, spiritually or socially. Varanasi, Gorakhpur and Kushinagar are some of the cities in Purvanchal that tell the tales of the rich legacy of their contribution to the nation. Their roots in ancient India highlight the brilliant ancestry that each of these cities possesses.

See also
Bhojpuri region

References

External links
 Purvanchal Website

Regions of Uttar Pradesh
Proposed states and union territories of India